The Korea Central Zoo, also referred to as the Pyongyang Central Zoo, is the national zoo of North Korea. It is located near Taesŏngsan mountain in downtown Pyongyang. The zoo has over 5,000 wild animals, comprising a total of 650 species, and covers an area of roughly one square kilometre. It was reportedly established in April 1959 at the instruction of Kim Il-sung.

Attractions
Elephants at the zoo are said to be one of the chief attractions; all the elephants are descended from the family of a single "hero elephant" given to Kim Il-sung by Ho Chi Minh in 1959. However, the zoo kept a variety of non-indigenous species of animals, including 400 given as gifts by heads of state and other foreign citizens. A significant number of those were the gift of a single Swedish citizen, Jonas Wahlström, director of the Skansen Aquarium; they are housed in the Animal Museum, which opened as a new exhibit in 1985. According to a report by The Daily Telegraph, a British newspaper, the zoo also has a parrot which can squawk "Long live the Great Leader, Comrade Kim Il-sung" in English. The Central Zoo conducted its first zoo exchange with South Korean zoos in April 2005, in which they received llamas and hippopotamuses, among other species of animals. Many of the animals sent south, which included Asiatic black bears, African ponies, and Siberian weasels, were first quarantined by South Korea before being shipped to their destinations.

The Central Zoo also has dogs on display for visitors to see, including eight raised by Kim Il-sung and given to the zoo after his death in 1994. A pair of Jindo dogs given by Kim Dae-jung to Kim Jong-il at their 2000 summit, are also kept at the zoo; they produced a litter of five puppies in September 2001.

In 2010, the zoo, along with several others in North Korea, was restocked with wildlife from Hwange National Park in Zimbabwe. Conservationists in the country condemned the deal, fearing the animals would not survive the long trip or the conditions in North Korea's zoos. Zimbabwean authorities sent veterinary experts to the zoo and were satisfied with the conditions there.

Criticisms
The Central Zoo has been criticised by Lonely Planet and Asia Times. The Lonely Planet travel guide for Korea described it as a "depressing and uninspiring place, best avoided". A 2006 report in the Asia Times described a North Korean movie entitled Fighting Animals, purporting to be a nature documentary, showing caged animals, often of different species, fighting each other to the death. The report noted that many of the animal species portrayed, which included endangered species, were only kept at the Central Zoo and nowhere else in North Korea; on this basis, they accused zookeepers there of being complicit in the production of the film, including placing animals of different species into the same cage and goading them to attack each other.  The zoo also stars a cigarette-smoking chimpanzee called Azalea, basketball-playing monkeys, doves that are part of a figure skating routine, and a dog who is trained to manipulate an abacus.

References

External links 

 The Central Zoo picture album at Naenara
 Gift Animals at Central Zoo picture album at Naenara
 Another picture album at Naenara
 
 
 

Zoos established in 1959
1959 establishments in North Korea
Zoos in North Korea
Parks in Pyongyang
20th-century architecture in North Korea